The Johri Enclave metro station is located on the Pink Line of the Delhi Metro. And just 400 meters away from RCS Convent Sr. Sec. School.
As part of Phase III of Delhi Metro, Johri Enclave is the metro station of the Pink Line.

Station layout

See also
List of Delhi Metro stations
Transport in Delhi
Delhi Metro Rail Corporation
Delhi Suburban Railway

References

External links

 Delhi Metro Rail Corporation Ltd. (Official site)
 Delhi Metro Annual Reports
 

Delhi Metro stations
Railway stations in Ghaziabad district, India